Saint Mary's Hospital may refer to:

Canada 
St. Mary's General Hospital, Kitchener, Ontario
St. Mary's Hospital (Montreal), Montreal, Quebec

Republic of Ireland 
St. Mary's Hospital, Castlebar
St. Mary's Hospital (Phoenix Park), Phoenix Park

South Korea 
Seoul St. Mary's Hospital, Banpo, Seoul; in the campus of Catholic University of Korea; the largest hospital building unit in Korea
Yeouido St. Mary's Hospital, Yeouido, Seoul

Uganda 
St. Mary's Hospital Lacor, Gulu

United Kingdom 
St Mary's Hospital, Burghill, Herefordshire, England
St Mary's Hospital, Isle of Wight, England
St Mary's Hospital, Kettering, Northamptonshire, England
St Mary's Hospital, London, England
St Mary's Hospital, Luton, Bedfordshire, England
Saint Mary's Hospital, Manchester, England
St Mary's Hospital, Portsmouth, Hampshire, England
St Mary's Hospital, Scarborough, England, a defunct hospital, formerly the town's union workhouse

United States 
 Ascension St. Mary's Hospital, Saginaw, Michigan
 Mercy Health Saint Mary's, Grand Rapids, Michigan
 St. Mary Medical Center (Langhorne), Langhorne, Pennsylvania
 St. Mary's Medical Center (Grand Junction, Colorado), Grand Junction, Colorado
 St. Mary's Hospital (Waterbury), Waterbury, Connecticut
 St. Mary's Health, Evansville, Indiana
 Saint Mary's Regional Medical Center (Maine), Lewiston, Maine
 St. Mary's Hospital (Leonardtown), Leonardtown, Maryland
 St. Mary Mercy Livonia, Livonia, Michigan
 Saint Marys Hospital (Rochester), Rochester, Minnesota
 St. Mary's Regional Medical Center (Reno), Reno, Nevada
 Hoboken University Medical Center, New Jersey, known as St. Mary Hospital from 1863 to 2007
 St. Mary's Hospital (Passaic), Passaic, New Jersey
 Mount Saint Mary's Hospital, Lewiston, New York
 St. Mary's Hospital, Galveston, Galveston, Texas (defunct)
 St. Mary's Hospital (Richmond), Richmond, Virginia
 St. Mary's Medical Center (Huntington), Huntington, West Virginia
 St. Mary's Hospital Medical Center, Green Bay, Wisconsin
 St. Mary's Hospital (Madison, Wisconsin), Madison, Wisconsin
 St. Mary's Hospital (Decatur, Illinois), Decatur, Illinois

See also
St Mary's Hospital Medical School, London
St. Mary's Medical Center (disambiguation)
St. Mary's Regional Medical Center (disambiguation)
St. Mary Medical Center (disambiguation)